Hersheypark (operating as "Hershey Park" through 1970) is an amusement park located in Hershey, Derry Township, Pennsylvania. The park was formally opened by Milton S. Hershey on May 30, 1906, and it became an entity of Hershey Estates when the estates company was established in 1927. From its opening in 1906 until 1970, it was an open-gate park. In 1971, the park was gated and an entry fee charged. This was the first preparations for the renovation project designed by R. Duell and Associates that would begin in 1972.  This is a list of former Hersheypark attractions.

The first ride the park removed was also the first purchased for the park, a Herschell-Spillman carousel called the "merry-go-round." It was in the park from 1908 until 1912.

Past and cancelled roller coasters
Hersheypark has removed five roller coasters over its history, and cancelled two projects prior to being built. Each of the five roller coasters removed were notable as being a park first: The Wild Cat was Hersheypark's first roller coaster, Wildcat, which opened in 1996, the Toboggans (initially called Twin Towers Toboggans because there were twin Toboggan coasters side-by-side) were Hersheypark's first steel roller coaster, Mini-Comet was Hersheypark's first kiddie coaster, and Roller Soaker was the park's only water coaster. The Mini-Comet was replaced by the Cocoa Cruiser, a kiddie coaster in the shadows of Storm Runner.

Hersheypark's two cancelled roller coaster projects were a proposed Flying Turns coaster and a proposed coaster named Turbulence. Flying Turns would have been opened in 1942, however America's entry into World War II effectively ended the project. 63 years later, Hersheypark was planning to open what would have been the park's eleventh existing coaster - Turbulence. Early in the project phase, a dispute arose between the park and the ride manufacturer. Initially postponed, the project never resumed and was cancelled.

Past thrill rides

The first major ride Hersheypark purchased was a small, used Herschell-Spillman Company carousel, in 1908. This ride was always referred as a merry-go-round rather than a carousel. The ride operated from June 1908 through at least 1912. It was placed adjacent to a ballfield, one of the main attractions in the park at the time, and above the pool area, which was located below the ballfield in the hollow along Spring Creek. This location was chosen for the carousel because Milton S. Hershey, who founded the park, wanted to have a miniature railroad operate in the park. The miniature railroad would connect the main entrance of the park (nearest to downtown Hershey and the train station serving the area) with the west end of the park where the carousel was.

The Miniature Railroad was the second major ride Hersheypark purchased. It debuted in September 1910, and the grand opening occurred in May 1911. The railroad would operate from 1910 to 1971, with the east station (located at the main entrance of the park) remaining the same throughout the line's history. The west station was relocated twice - first in 1930 when it was moved into the hollow, the year after the pool was relocated and Mill Chute was constructed, and a second time in 1950, when the line was truncated due to the installation of twin Ferris wheels. Hersheypark was gated in the 1971 season, and put a portion of the Miniature Railroad outside of the gate - the segment between the east station and the 1929 Hershey Park Pool. The ride was closed during the 1971 season and never reopened; the track was eventually lifted and the train was put into storage.

Hersheypark debuted a second carousel manufactured by the Denzel Carousel Company in June 1912. This carousel was larger, and was a newly built ride instead of being used. It was originally located in the west end of Hersheypark, near where the current main entrance of the park is located. Hersheypark called this ride Carrousel, misspelling the word carousel with two r's. In 1929, the carousel was relocated to a platform overlooking Comet Hollow, where it operated through the 1944 season. In 1945, Hersheypark had the opportunity to install a Philadelphia Toboggan Company carousel; they sold the Dentzel carousel and installed the PTC ride, which operates in the park to this day.

Hersheypark has had a variety of other thrill rides which no longer exist in the park today. The full list of these rides is below.

Past and cancelled water rides

Past kiddie rides

Past funhouses

Past attractions
These are attractions which the park had throughout its history. The athletic field was the center of activities when the park first opened in 1906, until the Merry-Go-Round carousel was installed in 1908.

Past park regions 
Hersheypark only began having themed areas in 1972 as park management was converting the park into a contemporary theme park. However, the park did have one specific area with a theme in years prior - Kiddieland. Since then, the park has had 20 different kinds of named areas within the park, some which were considered official themed areas and others which were not.

One example is when Hersheypark renovated an area of the park around the Comet and Spring Creek. The Bug was replaced with Wave Swinger and the area beautified. The area was also given a name: Spring Creek Hollow. However, since the area didn't gain any theming, only beautified, the park did not list it the themed areas of the park (such as Rhineland or Tower Plaza).

Former themed areas

Former named areas

Past characters
As a part of the adding a gate and one-price admission to Hersheypark, costume characters were now a part of the park's entertainment program. Since the beginning of this, there have been characters based on different Hershey products. These have gone through multiple design changes throughout the years. In addition to these, Hersheypark had its own mascot characters in the late 1970s and 1980s. These included the Furry Tales, which were three brightly colored animals - a skunk, a bear, and a chipmunk. These characters were featured in promotional materials, daily shows, and even had their own shop selling plush toys in Rhineland. Other discontinued characters include Pistol Pete and the rare character Kaptain Kid.

See also
List of Hersheypark attractions

References

External links

Lists of former amusement park attractions